The Hales Trophy (officially the North Atlantic Blue Riband Challenge Trophy) is an award for the fastest Atlantic crossing by a commercial passenger vessel.

The award was created in 1935 when Harold K. Hales, a British politician and owner of Hales Brothers shipping company, donated the trophy  to be a permanent, tangible expression of the Blue Riband, the unofficial accolade then given for this feat. Hales also wished to formalize the rules regarding the contest, which up to then had no official form, though they were, by tradition, widely recognized. The rules for the Hales Trophy were different from the traditional rules for the Blue Riband, and changed several times. For example, the Hales Trophy was originally only awarded for westbound records.

The trophy was awarded to just three Blue Riband holders during the express liner era; to the Italian liner Rex in 1935, the French Normandie in 1936, and the American United States in 1952. Cunard's Queen Mary, Blue Riband holder in 1936 and again from 1938 until 1952, did not receive the award for various reasons.

Following the retirement of United States in 1969 the award languished, until revived in 1990 for the Incat built passenger/car ferry Hoverspeed Great Britain when she established a new speed record for a commercial vessel on her eastbound delivery voyage without passengers that year. The trophy has been won twice since then, each time by an Incat built vessel.

The trophy
In 1935, Harold K. Hales (1868–1942), a member of the UK Parliament and owner of a shipping company, commissioned a Sheffield goldsmith to produce a large trophy to be presented to the fastest ship crossing the Atlantic.  The four-foot-tall, nearly 100-pound Hales Trophy is made of solid silver and heavy gilt fashioned with a globe resting on two winged figures of Victory standing on a base of carved green onyx, with an enamelled blue ribbon encircling the middle, and decorated with models of galleons, modern ocean liners and statues of Neptune and Amphitrite, god and goddess of the sea. The trophy is surmounted by a figure depicting speed pushing a three-stacked liner against a figure symbolizing the forces of the Atlantic, which is represented in blue enamel with the traditional ocean liner route indicated by a red enamelled line.

History
The rules for the trophy did not correspond to the traditional rules for the Blue Riband, in that the trophy was to be awarded only to a passenger ship achieving the fastest speed in the westbound direction. Other rule changes further complicated the situation. For example, before the trophy was finished, Hales made arrangements to present the trophy to the owners of Rex, the then Blue Riband record-holder. In the meantime, Normandie took the record and Hales changed the rules so that any new claimant must wait three months to give the current holder a chance to beat the new record. In August 1935, the trophy was presented to the Rex, and then transferred to the Normandie two months later.  Cunard White Star's Queen Mary was the next winner, but Cunard White Star refused to accept the trophy. The Queen'''s captain explained that, "We don't believe in racing on the Atlantic, or in blue ribands, or trophies and the like."  Hales again changed the rules so that the trophy could only be won by a "non-British ship".

Hales died in 1942 and the location of the trophy was unknown when the United States Lines (USL) started planning the maiden voyage of its new record breaker, the United States. The trophy was found at the Sheffield goldsmith where it had been originally made.  In 1952, USL accepted the trophy at a ceremony attended by 400 guests.  It was displayed in USL's New York City headquarters until after the United States was taken out of service in 1969. Ten years later, the trophy was transferred to the U.S. Merchant Marine Academy's museum as a relic.

In 1986, Richard Branson was successful in setting a new eastbound transatlantic speed record in the powerboat Challenger II. He was not awarded the Hales trophy because his boat was not a commercial vessel. In 1990, the  catamaran passenger/car ferry Hoverspeed Great Britain was scheduled to take a delivery voyage from her Australian builders to begin cross channel operations. Her owners confirmed with the Hales trophy trustees in the UK that their vessel would be eligible for the trophy if they beat the United States record, even though the ship would not actually carry passengers on the trip. The trustees ruled that the ship still met the criteria. After Hoverspeed Great Britain's successful voyage, the Maritime Museum considered challenging the decision on the grounds that Hales donated the award for ships providing Atlantic passenger service, but decided not to because of the cost of legal fees. The trophy resided on the premises of the owners of Cat-Link V'',Scandlines, until 2010 when they opted to put it on display in the lobby of The Danish Shipowners' Association, Amaliegade 33, Copenhagen. The Association, of which Scandlines is a member, then had it for a couple of years. An inter-active screen was created and installed, telling the highlights of the trophy's history, and a longer printed version with illustrations was placed next to the trophy case for all interested to take home. The trophy was subsequently returned to Scandlines' main office in Copenhagen, where it still stands.

Several replicas of the Hales Trophy exist. 
In 1998 Carnival Cruise Lines commissioned a replica for display on its cruise ship MS Paradise. They also had a duplicate made, for permanent loan to the Merchant Marine Academy Museum.
INCAT, the builders of the last three winners of the Hales Trophy, are in possession of a museum quality replica which is displayed at their Fast Ferry Museum in Hobart, Tasmania. The formal records of the Hales Trophy Trustees are now lodged with Lloyds Register in London.  Anyone wishing to access the formal records should contact Lloyds Register regarding obtaining permission to inspect the Hales Trophy Trust records.

Table of Hales Trophy winners

1935 to 1969 winners

Post 1969 winners

See also
 Virgin Atlantic Challenge Trophy
 Columbus Atlantic Trophy

References

Shipping awards